"R&B Junkie" is a song by American singer-songwriter Janet Jackson from her eighth studio album, Damita Jo (2004). Written by Jackson, James Harris III, Terry Lewis, Tony "Prof T" Tolbert, Michael Jones and Nicholas Trevisick, the track was released as a promotional single in 2004 by Virgin Records. "R&B Junkie" is an upbeat song which has a "retro" feel consisting of 1980s soul, R&B, funk, dance-pop and synths, while it samples Evelyn King's 1981 song "I'm in Love"; it has "oh-oh-ohs" throughout the verses.

"R&B Junkie" received positive reviews from music critics, who deemed it as one of the best songs from the album. The song peaked at number one on the Bubbling Under R&B/Hip-Hop Singles, as it received a limited release. "R&B Junkie" was performed by Jackson during the 2004 BET Awards, as well on the Las Vegas residency Metamorphosis and the A Special 30th Anniversary Celebration of Rhythm Nation tour in 2019.

Recording and composition
"R&B Junkie" was recorded in 2003, at Flyte Tyme Studios West at The Village, in Los Angeles, California. It was written by Janet Jackson, James Harris III, Terry Lewis, Tony "Prof T" Tolbert, Michael Jones and Nicholas Trevisick, while it was produced by Jackson, Jam and Lewis. The latter one also played the keyboards. The song had its drums and percussion played by Iz. Serban Ghenea did the mixing of "R&B Junkie" at MixStar Studios, Virginia Beach, with Tim Roberts being his assistant. Ian Cross engineered the song while Ghian Wright was an assistant. Additionally, the Pro-Tools engineer was John Hanes.

"R&B Junkie" is an upbeat song which has a "retro" feel consisting of 1980s funk, dance-pop, and synths. It transforms a brief sample from Evelyn King's 1981 song "I'm in Love" into a new composition. According to LA Weekly, it worked in the context of a song that is an "ode to old-school soul music and the dances those sounds inspired". The magazine also considered the song a "likely candidate for club hit of the summer". "R&B Junkie"'s positive vibe was described as a sonic "ambrosia" by Baltimore City Paper. Additionally, the song has "oh-oh-ohs" throughout the verses and on the chorus.

Critical reception
Angus Batey from Yahoo! Music described "R&B Junkie" as one of the high points from Damita Jo, describing it as a delicious throwback. BBC Music's Ian Warde asserted that the song "is a nice Evelyn Champagne King infused number that parties like it's 1982". Similarly, Michael Paoletta from Billboard called the song a "winner" from Damita Jo and noted that it "fabulously" referenced the sampled song. Mikael Wood from Baltimore City Paper commented that "R&B Junkie" had an enough positive vibe to shame American musician Michael J. Powell into early retirement. Ernest Hardy from LA Weekly described the song as the second best song from Damita Jo, after "Like You Don't Love Me". Spence D. from IGN called it as ultimately non-descript, despite considering it infectious.

Live performance
Jackson performed a medley of "All Nite (Don't Stop)" and "R&B Junkie" at the 2004 BET Awards. Following Jackson's Super Bowl XXXVIII halftime show controversy, various performances on TV were aired with a time delay per the U.S. Federal Communications Commission's guidelines, but the awards show was televised without a delay. The song was also used during the DJ Intermission on the 2015–2016 Unbreakable World Tour. In 2019, Jackson performed the song in concert at her Las Vegas residency Janet Jackson: Metamorphosis, and on the A Special 30th Anniversary Celebration of Rhythm Nation tour.

Track listing
US promotional CD single
"R&B Junkie" – 3:10

Credits and personnel
Credits adapted from the liner notes of Damita Jo.

 Janet Jackson – vocals, production
 James Harris III – production, keyboards
 Terry Lewis – production
 Tony Tolbert – background vocals
 IZ – drums, percussion
 Ian Cross – engineering
 Ghian Wright – engineering assistance
 Serban Ghenea – mixing
 Tim Roberts – mixing assistance
 John Hanes – Pro-Tools engineering

Charts

References

2004 songs
Janet Jackson songs
Post-disco songs
Song recordings produced by Jimmy Jam and Terry Lewis
Songs written by Janet Jackson
Songs written by Jimmy Jam and Terry Lewis
Virgin Records singles